Ladies Must Love is a 1933 American pre-Code comedy film directed by E. A. Dupont and written by John Francis Larkin. The film stars June Knight, Neil Hamilton, Sally O'Neil, Dorothy Burgess, Mary Carlisle and George E. Stone. The film was released on September 25, 1933, by Universal Pictures.

Cast 
June Knight as Jeannie Marlow
Neil Hamilton as Bill Langhorne
Sally O'Neil as Dot La Tour
Dorothy Burgess as Peggy Burns
Mary Carlisle as Sally Lou Cateret
George E. Stone as Joey
Maude Eburne as Mme. Fifi
Oscar Apfel as Herman Nussbauer
Edmund Breese as Thomas Van Dyne
Richard Carle as Wilbur Muller
Berton Churchill as Gaskins
Virginia Cherrill as Bill's Society Fiancée

References

External links 
 

1933 films
American comedy films
1933 comedy films
Universal Pictures films
Films directed by E. A. Dupont
American black-and-white films
1930s English-language films
1930s American films